C.P. Jones House and Law Office, also known as the Jones-McCoy House, Almond-Strickler House, and James Bell House, is a historic home and law office located at Monterey, Highland County, Virginia. The original section of the house dates to about 1850. Originally the house was a two-story, five-bay, side-gabled, four-room log building on a stone foundation. Several rooms and porches were added between the middle of the 19th century and the beginning of the 20th century and has a Folk Victorian style.  The law office was built about 1873, and is a one-story, front gable, frame building.  Also on the property are the contributing two-story, side-gabled garage/smoke house/woodshed, a one-story, front-gabled apple shed/cellar, a one-story brick spring house ruin.  It was the home of American soldier and politician Charles Pinckney Jones (1845-1914).

It was listed on the National Register of Historic Places in 2013.

References

External links

Houses on the National Register of Historic Places in Virginia
Houses completed in 1850
Victorian architecture in Virginia
Houses in Highland County, Virginia
National Register of Historic Places in Highland County, Virginia
Law offices
Legal history of Virginia